The Roman Catholic Diocese of Muyinga is a diocese located in the city of Muyinga in the ecclesiastical province of Gitega in Burundi.

History
 5 September 1968: Established as Diocese of Muyinga from the Diocese of Ngozi

Special churches
The cathedral is Our Lady of Lourdes Cathedral in Muyinga.

Bishops
 Bishops of Muyinga (Roman rite), in reverse chronological order
 Bishop Joachim Ntahondereye (since 14 December 2002)
 Bishop Jean-Berchmans Nterere (1 July 1994  – 5 May 2001)
 Bishop Roger Mpungu (6 March 1980  – 1 July 1994)
 Bishop Nestor Bihonda (5 September 1968  – 25 March 1977)

Coadjutor bishop
Jean-Berchmans Nterere (1992-1994)

See also
Roman Catholicism in Burundi

References

External links
 GCatholic.org
 Catholic Hierarchy 

Muyinga
Muyinga
Christian organizations established in 1968
Roman Catholic dioceses and prelatures established in the 20th century